Surovikin (Russian: Суровикин) is a Russian masculine surname; its feminine counterpart is Surovikina. It may refer to the following notable people:
Igor Surovikin (born 1962), Russian football coach and player
Sergey Surovikin (born 1966), Russian Armed Forces general of the army 

Russian-language surnames